Scrope v Grosvenor (1389) was an early intellectual property lawsuit, specifically regarding the law of arms. One of the earliest heraldic cases brought in England, the case resulted from two different knights in King Richard II's service, Richard Scrope, 1st Baron Scrope of Bolton and Sir Robert Grosvenor, discovering they were using the same undifferenced coat of arms, blazoned "Azure, a bend Or". This had previously gone unnoticed because the armigers' families were from different parts of England. As the law of arms by the 14th century prohibited armigers within the same system of arms from holding the same undifferenced arms, Scrope brought suit against Grosvenor in 1386 to determine who would be allowed to continue using the arms in question; the Court of Chivalry found in Scrope's favour in 1389, and King Richard affirmed the decision the following year.

Historical background
By the 12th and 13th centuries, the composition of coats of arms consisted of only one charge and two tinctures. However, this simplicity meant there were often times when unrelated families ended up bearing the same designs. By the 14th century, the sharing of coats of arms had become less tolerated. In many cases, the monarch was the final arbiter on any decision.

Heraldic case
In 1385, Richard II led his army on a punitive expedition to Scotland. During the military campaign, two of the king's knights, Richard Scrope, 1st Baron Scrope of Bolton, from Bolton in Yorkshire and Sir Robert Grosvenor from Cheshire, both realised they were using the same coat of arms, a blazoned "Azure, a bend Or". When Scrope brought an action, Grosvenor maintained his family had worn these arms since his ancestor had come to England with William the Conqueror in 1066.

The case was brought before the Court of Chivalry and presided over by Thomas of Woodstock, 1st Duke of Gloucester, the Constable of England. Several hundred witnesses were heard and these included John of Gaunt, Duke of Lancaster, Geoffrey Chaucer, himself a close friend of the Duke of Lancaster and a sometime member of his court; and a then little-known Welshman called Owain Glyndŵr, who gave his evidence with others at the Church of St John the Baptist in Chester on 3 September 1386.

It was not until 1389 that the case was finally decided in Scrope's favor. Grosvenor was allowed to continue bearing the arms but they had to be within a bordure argent for difference.

Neither party was happy with the decision so King Richard II was called upon to give his personal verdict. On 27 May 1390 he confirmed that Grosvenor could not bear the undifferenced arms. His opinion was that the two shields were far too similar for unrelated families in the same country to bear.

Third claimant

According to many of the trial witnesses, there was a third person who bore the arms "Azure a Bend Or". During the reign of Edward III in the Hundred Years' War, Grosvenor had previously challenged the right of a Cornish knight, Thomas Carminow, to bear the arms while serving in France in 1360. But neither party stopped using the same coat of arms.

Carminow had also challenged the right of Scrope to bear the same arms. In this case, the Lord High Constable of England had ruled that both claimants had established their right to the arms. Carminow had stated that his family had borne the arms from the time of King Arthur, while Scrope said they had been used since the time of the Norman Conquest. In reality this was a legal fiction because there was no such thing as an inheritable coat of arms at the time of their claimed foundations. Instead the two families were considered to be of different heraldic nations: Scrope of England and Carminow of Cornwall. As stated in the trial records, Cornwall was still treated – at the time of the case – as a separate country, "a large land formerly bearing the name of a kingdom."

Outcome

Since the judgment of 1390, both the Carminow and Scrope families continued to used undifferenced arms. However, Grosvenor had to choose a new design for his shield. He assumed arms of Azure a Garb Or, the ancient arms of the Earls of Chester. (In the terminology of blazons, a "garb" is a wheatsheaf). The coat of arms is still used by his family's descendant, the Dukes of Westminster.

Legacy
A thoroughbred racehorse, born in 1877 and owned by Hugh Grosvenor, 1st Duke of Westminster, was named Bend Or in allusion to the case. It won The Derby in 1880.

The 1st Duke's grandson, Hugh (1879–1953), afterwards 2nd Duke, was similarly from his childhood and in adult life known within family circles as "Bendor". His wife Loelia wrote in her memoirs: "Of course everybody, even his parents and sisters, would normally have addressed the baby as "Belgrave" so they may have thought that any nickname was preferable. At all events it stuck, and my husband's friends never called him anything but Bendor or Benny".

The art historian Bendor Grosvenor is a member of the Grosvenor family.

See also
Court of Chivalry
College of Arms
Warbelton v Gorges

Notes

Citations

Bibliography
Nicolas, Sir Nicholas Harris The Controversy between Sir Richard Scrope and Sir Robert Grosvenor in the Court of Chivalry AD MCCCLXXXV - MCCCXC, 3 Volumes:
Volume 1 (a transcript of the original Latin "Scrope and Grosvenor Roll" then held in the Tower of London), edited by Sir Nicholas Harris Nicolas,  printed in limited edition of 150 copies by Samuel Bentley, London, 1832 
Volume 2 (English translation), edited by Sir Nicholas Harris Nicolas, London, 1832 
Volume 3, planned publication date 1833

Further reading
Michel Pastoreau. Heraldry: An Introduction to a Noble Tradition. (New York: Harry N Abrams, Inc., 1997), 104–5.
George Squibb. The High Court of Chivalry: A Study of the Civil Law in England. (Oxford: Clarendon Press, 1959).
George Squibb. The Law of Arms in England. (London: The Heraldry Society, 1967).

English heraldry
1390s in law

1390s in England
English case law
Heraldry and law
United Kingdom intellectual property case law
1390 in Europe